Hacıəbdürəhimoba (also, Hacıəbdürrəhimoba, Hacıədbürəhimoba, Gadzhabduragimoba, and Gadzhyabduragimoba) is a village in the Khachmaz Rayon of Azerbaijan.  The village forms part of the municipality of Bostançı.

References 

Populated places in Khachmaz District